Keeler Farm is a census-designated place in Luna County, New Mexico, United States. Its population was 1,305 as of the 2010 census.

Like other areas in Luna County, the community is in the Deming Public Schools school district.

Demographics

References

Census-designated places in New Mexico
Census-designated places in Luna County, New Mexico